The War Master, announced in June 2017, is a Big Finish Productions audio play series based on the TV show Doctor Who. It sees the return of Sir Derek Jacobi as the Master, a role he previously portrayed in the TV story "Utopia". The first volume consists of a four-CD box set; it was released in December 2017. In July 2018, a further 3 series were confirmed for release between December 2018 – December 2019.

In January 2019, Paul McGann was confirmed as an appearance within the third series, Rage of the Time Lords, as the Eighth Doctor alongside Jacobi. Seán Carlsen reprised his role as Narvin from the Gallifrey series alongside Pippa Bennett-Warner and Nicholas Briggs as Livia and the Daleks.

The series was created by Scott Handcock, who is the producer of the range as well as director and script-editor for sets released between 2017 and 2024. It was announced that he will be succeeded by Robert Valentine, after Handcock became a script editor for future series of Doctor Who on screen.

Cast

Notable guests

Silas Carson as The Ood
Samantha Béart as Martine King
Maeve Bluebell Wells as Cassandra King
Pippa Haywood as Teremon
Pippa Bennett-Warner as Livia
Colin McFarlane as Captain Morski
Luyanda Unati Lewis-Nyawo as The Scaramancer
Katy Manning as Jo Jones
Sarah Sutton as Nyssa
Alexander Vlahos as Dorian Gray
Richard Earl as Dr. Watson
Gethin Anthony as The Shadow

Episodes

Series 1: Only the Good (2017)

Series 2: The Master of Callous (2018)

Series 3: Rage of the Time Lords (2019)

Series 4: Anti-Genesis (2019)

Series 5: Hearts of Darkness (2020)

Series 6: Killing Time (2021)

Series 7: Self-Defence (2022)

Series 8: Escape from Reality (2022)

Series 9: Solitary Confinement

Series 10: Rogue Encounters

Series 11: Future Phantoms

Awards and nominations

References

Audio plays based on Doctor Who
Big Finish Productions
Doctor Who spin-offs
The Master (Doctor Who) audio plays